Herman Vanspringel (14 August 1943 – 25 August 2022), also spelled Herman Van Springel, was a Belgian road racing cyclist, from Grobbendonk, in the Flemish Campine or Kempen region. He achieved podium finishes in all three of the grand tours with second place in the  1968 Tour de France and 1971 Giro d'Italia, and third place in the 1970 Vuelta a España. He wore the maillot jaune during four stages of the 1968 Tour de France and for three stages in 1973.

Career
Vanspringel was an accomplished time-trial rider, almost winning the Tour de France in 1968. He was beaten in the last stage by Dutch rider Jan Janssen in a time-trial. This remains as one of the closest races in Tour de France history. In the autumn that year, he won the classic Giro di Lombardia.

He won a record seven editions of the marathon Bordeaux–Paris. He also won the Green Jersey in the 1973 Tour de France without winning a single stage. He finished in 6th place overall that year, the third time in his career he would finish in the top 10 of the Tour de France. He would finish in the top 10 one final time during the 1974 edition. He would win a total of five stages during his ten participations in the Tour.

He was not allowed to ride the 1972 Tour de France due to signing for rival team Rokado for the 1973 season.

Vanspringel cycled through the 1970s and ended his career at the end of the 1981 season. As a professional cyclist, he eventually won 136 road races.

Flemish TV-maker and presenter, Mark Uytterhoeven, motivated by the 1968 Tour, founded a Herman Vanspringel fan club.

Major results 
Sources:

1963
 3rd Tour de Liège
1964
 3rd Brussels-Opwijk
1966
 1st Gent–Wevelgem
 1st Brussel–Ingooigem
 1st Flèche Hesbignonne
 1st Grote Prijs Jef Scherens
 1st Stage 2 Critérium du Dauphiné Libéré
 1st Prix de St. Amands
 3rd Milan–San Remo
 3rd Circuit des Frontières
 6th Overall Tour de France
1967
 1st Stages 6 (TTT) & Stage 7 Tour de France
 1st Flèche Hesbignonne
 2nd Overall Tour of Belgium
1st Stage 2b
 2nd Bordeaux–Paris
 2nd Grote Prijs Jef Scherens
 3rd Antwerpse Havenpijl
1968
 1st Super Prestige Pernod International
 2nd  Road race, UCI Road World Championships
 2nd Overall Tour de France
1st Stages 3 (TTT) & 13
Held  after stages 3a-3b and 19-22a
 1st Giro di Lombardia
 1st Omloop Het Volk
 1st Omloop van Midden-België
 1st Trefle a Quatre Feuilles 
 2nd Paris–Roubaix
 2nd Grand Prix des Nations
 2nd Trofeo Baracchi (with Ole Ritter)
 2nd Wattrelos–Meulebeke
 3rd Rund um den Henniger Turm
 3rd Overall Tour de Suisse
1st Stage 1
 3rd Overall Tour of Belgium
1st Stage 1
 3rd E3 Harelbeke
1969
 1st Stages 10 and 21 Tour de France
 1st Paris–Tours
 1st Stages 4, 7 and 10 Tour de Suisse
 1st Grand Prix des Nations
 1st  Overall À travers Lausanne
1st Stages 1 (TTT) & 2
 1st Trofeo Baracchi with Joaquim Agostinho
 1st Stage 1 Four Days of Dunkirk
 1st Rund um den Henninger-Turm
 1st Trofeo Baracchi (with Joaquim Agostinho)
 1st G.P de Baden-Baden (with Roger De Vlaeminck)
 1st Omloop van Midden-België
 1st GP van Malderen
 2nd Giro di Lombardia
 2nd Wattrelos–Meulebeke
 2nd Grand Prix Pino Cerami
 3rd Overall Tour of Belgium
1st Stage 2b
 3rd Rund um den Henninger Turm
 3rd Gran Premio di Lugano
1970
 1st Bordeaux–Paris
 1st Brabantse Pijl
 1st Grand Prix des Nations
 1st Schaal Sels
 1st Heistse Pijl
 1st Omloop Schelde-Durme
 1st Omloop van het Zuidwesten
 1st Stage 3 Tour of Belgium
 2nd Belgian National Road Race Championships
 2nd Critérium des As
 3rd Overall Vuelta a España
 3rd Overall Critérium du Dauphiné Libéré
 3rd Trofeo Baracchi with Willy In't Ven
1971
 1st National Road race Championships 
 1st Stages 1 (TTT) & 16b Tour de France
 1st Züri-Metzgete
 1st Nokere Koerse
 1st G.P de Baden-Baden (with Eddy Merckx)
 1st GP Union Dortmund
 1st Wattrelos–Meulebeke
 1st Cronostafetta
 1st Maaslandse Pijl
 2nd Overall Giro d'Italia
 2nd Overall Tour of Belgium
1st Stage 3
 2nd Paris–Roubaix
 2nd Boucles de l'Aulne
 3rd Overall Giro di Sardegna
 3rd Gran Premio di Lugano
1972
 1st  Interclubs TTT, National Road Championships
 1st GP Stad Zottegem
 1st Cronostafetta
 1st Trofee Luc Van Biesen 
 1st Kessel–Lier
 1st Brussels–Biévenne
 1st Wezenbeek–Oppem
 2nd Brabantse Pijl
 2nd Scheldeprijs
 2nd Overall Tour de la Nouvelle-France
 2nd Leeuwse Pijl
 2nd Giro del Mendrisio
 2nd Trefle a Quatre Feuilles
 3rd Liège–Bastogne–Liège
 3rd Tour du Condroz
 3rd Subida a Arrate
 3rd Omloop der Grensstreek
1973
 1st Stage 9 Volta a Catalunya
 1st Stage 4 Tour de Suisse
 1st Stage 6 (TTT) Paris–Nice
 2nd Grand Prix of Aargau Canton
 2nd Overall Tour of Belgium
1st Stage 1 (TTT)
 2nd Overall Giro di Sardegna
 3rd Amstel Gold Race
 3rd Brabantse Pijl
 3rd Giro di Lombardia
 3rd Overall Setmana Catalana de Ciclisme
 6th Overall Tour de France
1st  points classification
Held  after stages 1b-2b
1974
 1st Brabantse Pijl
 1st E3 Prijs Vlaanderen
 1st Boucles de l'Aulne
 1st Bordeaux–Paris
 1st GP Betekom
 3rd Overall Tour de Luxembourg
 3rd Grand Prix Impanis-Van Petegem
1975
 1st Bordeaux–Paris
 1st GP Desselgem
 1st Omloop van Oost-Vlaanderen
 2nd Critérium des As
 3rd Overall Tour de Luxembourg
 3rd Omloop van Neeroeteren
1976
 1st Nationale Sluitingsprijs
 1st Grand Prix de Wallonie
 2nd Bordeaux–Paris
 2nd Rebecq-Rognon
 2nd Omloop der Leievallei
1977
 1st Bordeaux–Paris
 1st Stage 7 Paris–Nice
 1st Stage 2 Three Days of De Panne
 2nd Flèche Hesbignonne
 2nd Critérium des As
 3rd La Flèche Wallonne
1978
 1st Bordeaux–Paris
 1st Le Samyn
 1st Omloop van het Houtland
 2nd Gullegem Koerse
 2nd Brabantse Pijl
 3rd Critérium des As
1979
 2nd Overall Tour of Belgium
1st Stage 5
 2nd Omloop der Grensstreek
 3rd Bordeaux–Paris
1st Stage 4a
 3rd GP Stad Zottegem
1980
 1st Bordeaux–Paris
 2nd Critérium des As
 3rd Grand Prix Impanis-Van Petegem
 3rd Omloop van Midden-Brabant
1981
 1st Bordeaux–Paris
 2nd Critérium des As
 2nd Nokere Koerse
 2nd GP Beeckman

Grand Tour general classification results timeline
Source:

Books 

 Herman Vanspringel – De Winnende Verliezer (112p, ISBN 9789053121399) by Robert Janssens and Tom Willems: 1999
 Herman Vanspringel (48p, ISBN 9789074128339) by Noël Truyers: 1999
 Herman Vanspringel 68 (159p, ISBN 9789491376016) by Mark Uytterhoeven: 2011
 Herman Vanspringels Diamonds For Ever (207p) by Luc Wuyts and Marc Uytterhoeven: 2020

Honours 

 A cycling race Herman Vanspringels Diamond: From 1988
 Honory Citizen of Grobbendonk
 Honory Citizen of Kalmthout
 A statue in Grobbendonk: 2022

References

External links
 

1943 births
2022 deaths
20th-century Belgian people
21st-century Belgian people
Belgian male cyclists
Belgian Tour de France stage winners
Tour de Suisse stage winners
Cyclists from Antwerp Province
People from Ranst
Super Prestige Pernod winners